Leroy Milton Grider (September 22, 1854 – November 16, 1919) was a pioneer land developer in Los Angeles County, California in the late 19th and early 20th centuries. He was said to be the originator of the excursion method of selling residential lots. He was also a Los Angeles City Council member and a businessman known for establishing a noted pet store in that city. He was the target of a publicized but unsuccessful suit by his wife for a legal separation in 1914.

Vocation 

Grider first opened a real estate office in Downey and then moved to a space in Los Angeles at First and Main Streets. He "was said to be the first real estate man in the city to use the excursion method of selling lots," and he eventually opened and sold property in 26 subdivisions, including Sunnyside, Bell, Floral Park, Grant Place, Lomita Park and Manchester Heights, often by "giving old-fashioned Spanish barbecues on the sites."

A Democrat, Grider ran for Los Angeles County assessor or recorder in 1890, and he was a Los Angeles City Council member in 1896–1898; he was also a fire commissioner. He was a member of the Native Sons of the Golden West and the Knights of Pythias. According to the Los Angeles Times, "he established the business in this city known as Birdland, where birds of all kinds and descriptions, as well as other kinds of pets, were on sale and exhibition." It was the largest bird store in Los Angeles.

Personal

Early 
The family moved to Los Angeles in 1854 or 1857 and it was there that Grider, when grown, began his career in real estate.

Marriage 
They were living in separate parts of the house at 1160 East Pico Street, situated adjacent to the Birdland business that Grider owned and managed.

The lawsuit was denied by Judge Monroe, who "found that there was absolutely no ground for divorce on the allegation of extreme cruelty."

Death 
The cause was given as "an affection of the heart which had been bothering him for several years."
He had two children, Mrs. Idella Webster (later Idella Grider Manisera and also identified as Mrs. Isabella Moore) and Charles C. Grider. Burial was in Inglewood Cemetery.

References

External links 
 

1854 births
1919 deaths
19th-century American businesspeople
19th-century American politicians
Burials at Inglewood Park Cemetery
Businesspeople from Los Angeles
Los Angeles City Council members